The 1960 NCAA University Division baseball tournament was played at the end of the 1960 NCAA University Division baseball season to determine the national champion of college baseball.  The tournament concluded with eight teams competing in the College World Series, a double-elimination tournament in its fourteenth year.  Eight regional districts sent representatives to the College World Series with preliminary rounds within each district serving to determine each representative.  These events would later become known as regionals.  Each district had its own format for selecting teams, resulting in 25 teams participating in the tournament at the conclusion of their regular season, and in some cases, after a conference tournament.  The College World Series was held in Omaha, NE from June 10 to June 20.  The fourteenth tournament's champion was Minnesota, coached by Dick Siebert.  The Most Outstanding Player was John Erickson of Minnesota.

Tournament
The official NCAA record book does not list any participants for District 5 as Oklahoma State was an automatic qualifier for the 1960 College World Series.

District 1
Games played at Springfield, Massachusetts.

District 2
Games played at Cooperstown, New York.

District 3
Games played at Gastonia, North Carolina.

District 4
Games played at Saint Paul, Minnesota.
{{4Team2ElimBracket
| RD1=First Round
| RD2=Semi-Finals
| RD3=Finals

| RD1-seed1=
| RD1-team1=Minnesota
| RD1-score1=15
| RD1-seed2=
| RD1-team2=
| RD1-score2=6

| RD1-seed3=
| RD1-team3=
| RD1-score3=16
| RD1-seed4=
| RD1-team4=
| RD1-score4=2

| RD1-seed5=
| RD1-team5=Notre Dame
| RD1-score5=4
| RD1-seed6=
| RD1-team6=Ohio
| RD1-score6=5| RD2-seed1=
| RD2-team1=Minnesota| RD2-score1=12| RD2-seed2=
| RD2-team2=Detroit
| RD2-score2=5

| RD2-seed3=
| RD2-team3=Detroit| RD2-score3=14| RD2-seed4=
| RD2-team4=Ohio
| RD2-score4=4

| RD3-seed1=
| RD3-team1=Minnesota| RD3-score1-1=5| RD3-score1-2=—
| RD3-seed2=
| RD3-team2=Detroit
| RD3-score2-1=4
| RD3-score2-2=—
}}

District 5Oklahoma State (automatic qualifier)

District 6

District 7
Games played at Salt Lake City, Utah.

District 8
Games played at Los Angeles, California.

College World Series

Participants

Results

Bracket

Game results

All-Tournament Team
The following players were members of the All-Tournament Team.

Notable players
 Arizona: Charlie Shoemaker, Bart Zeller
 Boston College: 
 Minnesota: Jim Rantz
 North Carolina: 
 Northern Colorado: Cisco Carlos
 Oklahoma State: Frank Linzy, Don Wallace
 Southern California: Mike Gillespie, Bill Heath, Marcel Lachemann, Tom Satriano, Ron Stillwell
 St. John's:''' Larry Bearnarth

Tournament Notes
Jim Wixson throws the second no-hitter in College World Series history.

Notes

References

NCAA Division I Baseball Championship
Tournament
NCAA University Division Baseball
Baseball in Austin, Texas